João Mário may refer to:

Footballers
João Mário (footballer, born 1966), Portuguese midfielder
João Mário (footballer, born January 1993), Portugal international  football midfielder
João Mário (Bissau-Guinean footballer) (born 1993), Guinea Bissau international forward
João Mário (footballer, born 2000), Portuguese forward

Others
João Mário Grilo (born 1958), Portuguese film director

See also
 

Portuguese masculine given names